Green-winged bulbul may refer to:

 Cinereous bulbul (connectens), a subspecies of bird found on northern Borneo
 Mountain bulbul, a species of bird found in Southeast Asia 
 Sunda bulbul, a species of bird found on Sumatra and Java

Birds by common name